Albert Duro (born 16 February 1978) is an Albanian former footballer.

Duro is a former Albanian international and played for Romanian top division club Steaua București and Național București. He is the younger brother of Klodian Duro who was also a footballer.

International career
He made his debut for Albania in a June 1999 European Championship qualification match against Norway in Tiranan and earned a total of 5 caps, scoring no goals. His final international was an April 2000 friendly match against Macedonia.

National team statistics

Honours

Club 
 Steaua București
 Romanian League Championship: 2000–01
Dinamo Tirana
 Albanian Superliga: 2001–02

References

External links
 
 
 

1978 births
Living people
Footballers from Elbasan
Albanian footballers
Association football central defenders
Albania international footballers
KF Elbasani players
FC Steaua București players
FK Dinamo Tirana players
FC Progresul București players
KF Tirana players
KF Teuta Durrës players
Besa Kavajë players
Albanian expatriate footballers
Expatriate footballers in Romania
Albanian expatriate sportspeople in Romania
Liga I players